Mary Jeannette Schoelen  is a Senior judge of the United States Court of Appeals for Veterans Claims.

Early life and education
Schoelen was born in Rota, Spain, where her father, a career naval officer, was stationed. She received a Bachelor of Arts from the University of California at Irvine in 1990 and Juris Doctor from the George Washington University Law School in 1993. During law school, she worked as a law clerk for the National Veterans Legal Services Project, representing appellants at the Board of Veterans' Appeals.

Legal career

In 1994, Schoelen interned with the United States Senate Committee on Veterans' Affairs, working on various issues pertaining to adjudication of veterans benefits claims.  In November 1994, she began working as a staff attorney for Vietnam Veterans of America's Veterans Benefits Program.

Schoelen rejoined the United States Senate Committee on Veterans' Affairs staff in March 1997, where she was responsible for development and implementation of policy pertaining to veterans benefits, as well as oversight of the implementation of the policy.  She served as Minority Counsel from March 1997 to March 2001, as Minority General Counsel from March 2001 to June 2001, as Deputy Staff Director for Benefits Programs and General Counsel from June 2001 to January 2003, and Deputy Staff Director for Benefits Programs and General Counsel from January 2003 to December 2004 under Chairman and Ranking Member John D. Rockefeller IV and Ranking Member Bob Graham.

Court of Appeals for Veterans Claims 
On December 20, 2004, Schoelen was sworn into office for a 15 year term on the United States Court of Appeals for Veterans Claims.  She was nominated by President George W. Bush.

References

External links

Material on this page was adapted from the United States Court of Appeals for Veterans Claims biography of Judge Mary J. Schoelen, a source in the public domain.

Living people
Judges of the United States Court of Appeals for Veterans Claims
United States Article I federal judges appointed by George W. Bush
21st-century American judges
University of California, Irvine alumni
George Washington University Law School alumni
Year of birth missing (living people)